EA Replay is a retro-themed compilation for the PlayStation Portable comprising a number of classic games. It was released in the United States on November 14, 2006, with Australian and European releases shortly afterwards.

A sequel, EA Replay 2, was planned, but it was cancelled.

Compiled games
The compilation includes the following titles:

AD HOC Multiplayer is available for Budokan, Mutant League Football, and Road Rash II.

There are unlockable pieces of game art for each title.

The music in the Road Rash games, which by most fans is considered crucial to the series' feel, has been replaced with a single looping new music track.

The collection was released as a digital download for the PlayStation Network in Europe on January 22, 2009.

References

2006 video games
PlayStation Portable games
PlayStation Portable-only games
Electronic Arts video game compilations
Video games developed in Canada